KT, kT or kt may refer to:

Arts and media
 KT Bush Band, group formed by musician Kate Bush
 KT (film), a 2002 Japanese political thriller film, based on the real-life kidnapping of Kim Dae-jung
 Karlstads-Tidningen (KT), a Swedish newspaper released in Karlstad
 Knight (chess), a board game piece (as used in notation)

Businesses and organizations
 KT Corporation, a telecommunications company in South Korea, formerly Korea Telecom
 Kataller Toyama, a football club in Japan
 Kensington Temple, a Pentecostal church in west London, UK
 Koei Tecmo, a holding company created in 2009 by the merger of Japanese video game companies Koei and Tecmo
 Birgenair (IATA code KT), a former Turkish charter airline company with headquarters in Istanbul, Turkey

People
 KT Manu Musliar (born 1934), Indian Islamic scholar, orator, and writer
 K. T. McFarland (born 1951), American government official and political commentator
 K. T. Oslin (1942–2020), American country music singer and songwriter
 K.T. Sankaran (born 1954), Indian judge
 KT Sullivan, American singer and actress
 KT Tunstall (born 1975), Scottish singer-songwriter
 Kola Tubosun, Nigerian writer and linguist

Places
 KT postcode area, UK, covering south west London and north Surrey in England
 Christmas Island [NATO country code: KT], an Australian territory in the Indian Ocean
 Kastoria, Greece (vehicle plate code KT)
 Katy, Texas, named after the railroad line Kansas-Texas-Missouri
 Kitzingen, Germany (vehicle plate code KT)
 Kuala Terengganu, a city in Malaysia
 Kutina, Croatia (vehicle plate code KT)
 Tarnów, Poland (vehicle plate code KT)

Science and technology

Physics and chemistry
 Kt, karat or Carat, in analyzing gold alloys
 kT (energy), in physics, used as a scaling factor for energy values in molecular-scale systems
 Kilotesla (kT), a unit of magnetic flux density
 Kiloton (kt), a measure of energy released in explosions
 motor torque constant (KT)
 Knot (unit), a unit of velocity (although "kn" is the preferred symbol)
 Kosterlitz–Thouless transition in statistical mechanics

Vehicles
 Kriegstransporter, a series of World War II German merchant ships (KT 1 - KT 62), such as KT 3
 King Tiger, a German tank designed during World War II
 KT for Krylatyj Tank, the Antonov A-40 tank, also nicknamed the "flying tank" or "winged tank"

Medicine
 Klippel–Trénaunay syndrome, a rare congenital medical condition in which blood vessels and/or lymph vessels fail to form properly.

Other uses in science and technology
 KT Event - Cretaceous–Paleogene extinction event or K-Pg event, formerly known as the Cretaceous-Tertiary or KT event, a mass extinction of species approximately 66 million years ago
 K–Pg boundary, formerly the K-T boundary, geologic abbreviation for the transition between the Cretaceous and Paleogene periods
 Kardashev scale, method of measuring an advanced civilization's level of technological advancement
 Kotlin (programming language), a programming language for the Java Virtual Machine

Titles
 Knight Bachelor (Kt), part of the British honours system
 Knight of the Thistle (KT), a member of the Order of the Thistle
 Knight Templar, top degree of York Rite system - freemansory

Other uses 
 "Kept Term" as in ATKT (Allowed to keep terms), used in Indian education system
 KT, acronym for Knowledge transfer, transferring knowledge from one part of an organization to another
 Kaituozhe (rocket family), which uses the prefix KT
Kennitala (kt.), the Icelandic identification number

See also
 Kati (disambiguation)
 Katie
 Katy (disambiguation)